The 1997 World Games, the fifth World Games, were an international multi-sport event held in Lahti, Finland on August 7–17, 1997. The opening and closing ceremonies took place at the Lahti Sport Centre.

Sports

Calendar

|-
|bgcolor=#00cc33|●||Opening ceremony||bgcolor=#3399ff|●||Event competitions||bgcolor=#ffcc00|●||Event finals||bgcolor=#ee3333|●||Closing ceremony
|-

|-
! August
! 7th
! 8th
! 9th
! 10th
! 11th
! 12th
! 13th
! 14th
! 15th
! 16th
! 17th
|-
| Ceremonies||bgcolor=#00cc33 align=center|●|| || || || || || || || || ||bgcolor=#ee3333 align=center|●
|-
| Bodybuilding|| ||bgcolor=#ffcc00 align=center|●||bgcolor=#ffcc00 align=center|●|| || || || || || || ||
|-
| Bowling|| ||bgcolor=#ffcc00 align=center|●||bgcolor=#ffcc00 align=center|●||bgcolor=#ffcc00 align=center|●|| || || || || || ||
|-
| Casting|| || || ||bgcolor=#ffcc00 align=center|●||bgcolor=#ffcc00 align=center|●||bgcolor=#ffcc00 align=center|●|| || || || ||
|-
| DanceSport|| || || ||bgcolor=#ffcc00 align=center|●||bgcolor=#ffcc00 align=center|●|| || || || || ||
|-
| Fistball|| || ||bgcolor=#3399ff align=center|●||bgcolor=#3399ff align=center|●||bgcolor=#ffcc00 align=center|●|| || || || || ||
|-
| Gymnastics|| || || || ||bgcolor=#ffcc00 align=center|●||bgcolor=#ffcc00 align=center|●||bgcolor=#ffcc00 align=center|●|| ||bgcolor=#ffcc00 align=center|●||bgcolor=#ffcc00 align=center|●||
|-
| Ju-jitsu|| || || || || || || || ||bgcolor=#ffcc00 align=center|●||bgcolor=#ffcc00 align=center|●||bgcolor=#ffcc00 align=center|●
|-
| Korfball|| || || || || || ||bgcolor=#3399ff align=center|●||bgcolor=#3399ff align=center|●||bgcolor=#3399ff align=center|●||bgcolor=#3399ff align=center|●||bgcolor=#ffcc00 align=center|●
|-
| Squash|| || || || ||bgcolor=#3399ff align=center|●|| || || || ||bgcolor=#3399ff align=center|●||bgcolor=#ffcc00 align=center|●
|-
| Tug of war|| || || || || || || || || ||bgcolor=#ffcc00 align=center|●||bgcolor=#ffcc00 align=center|●
|-
! August
! 7th
! 8th
! 9th
! 10th
! 11th
! 12th
! 13th
! 14th
! 15th
! 16th
! 17th

Medal table

Official sports
The medal tally during the fifth World Games is as follows. United States finished at the top of the final medal table. Two bronze medals were awarded in each of the nine karate kumite events. No bronze medals were awarded in two bodybuilding and three weightlifting events. No silver medal was awarded in one weightlifting event.

Invitation sports

Medalists

Bodybuilding
The venue was the Lahti City Theater. The competition took place on August 8 and 9.

Men

Women

Bowling
The venue was the Lahti Bowling Centre. The competition took place on August 8 to 10.

Men

Women

Mixed

Casting
The venue was the Kisapuisto Sports Park. The competition took place on August 10 to 12.

Men

The source available does not say whether or not there was a Men's Multiplier Distance Single Handed event.

Women

DanceSport
The venue was the Urheilutalo. The competition took place on August 10 and 11.

Fistball
The venue was the Lahti Sport Centre. The competition took place on August 9 to 11.

Gymnastics

Sports acrobatics

Men

Women

Mixed

Sports aerobics

Men

Women

Mixed

Trampoline
These were the final individual events of trampoline at the World Games. The individual trampoline has been part of the program of the Olympic Games from 2000.

Men

Women

Tumbling

Men

Women

Korfball

Squash

The competition took place at Suurhalli Exhibition.

Men

Women

Tug of war

Men

Women (invitational)

References

Sources
World Games News - Number 11 - Dec.1996
World Games News - Number 13 - May 1997

External links
 The IWGA

 
1997
1997 in multi-sport events
International sports competitions hosted by Finland
1997 in Finnish sport
Multi-sport events in Finland
Sports competitions in Lahti
August 1997 sports events in Europe